Slang is the sixth studio album by English rock band Def Leppard, released on 14 May 1996. The album marked a musical departure from their signature sound; it was produced by the band with Pete Woodroffe and was their first album since 1980 without involvement by Robert John "Mutt" Lange. Slang is the first album with new material to feature new guitarist Vivian Campbell (Campbell had previously played on the B-side collection Retro Active in 1993 and on the new song on Vault a year earlier). It charted at #14 on the Billboard 200 and #5 on the UK Albums Chart. It is also the only Def Leppard album that does not feature their recognisable font logo on the album cover, though all its singles still bore the classic logo.

Overview
Between the releases of Retro Active and Slang, Def Leppard endured hardships including guitarist Phil Collen's divorce from actress Jacqueline Collen, bassist Rick Savage's battle with Bell's palsy and the death of his father, and the arrests of both drummer Rick Allen and lead singer Joe Elliott for spousal abuse and assault, respectively.  Though the band says Adrenalize was recorded during a bleaker time, the absence of Mutt Lange (for the first time on a Def Leppard album since 1980) made it possible for the band to show what they were really feeling. Said Elliott, "There was a period with Mutt where if you came out with anything slightly negative, it was 'Fuck it!' and it was gone!"  Collen continued: "We've all got personal things that have happened during the recording of Slang, and we've just ploughed on and some of it has come out on the record."

Doing without Lange's services, the band changed another habit by recording together, in a townhouse in Marbella, Spain. Slang would feature less production in favour of a more organic sound, catalysed by Allen's reversion to a semi-acoustic drum kit.  "We'd got so sick of recording the old way.  We didn't want to do it any more.  We wanted the music to be more personalised and let the character of the individuals to come out," explained Savage.

"We knew we couldn't make a typical Def Leppard album in the mid-1990s," said Vivian Campbell. "Grunge was very much happening and our stuff was anathema at the time… Personally, I think we could have bolstered the songs with a little more of that Def Lep fairy dust… but instead we went, 'No, let's keep it raw: no backing vocals; let's not do that part because it's too melodic; let's be more monotone… At least it gave us the chance to grow up a little. We live in a state of arrested development in this band, singing songs like 'Let's Get Rocked'. So we did get to write some grown-up lyrics. And we were going through a lot of shit at that time: Sav's dad died on the eve of the first recording day; both Joe and Phil were going through divorces… So it gave us an opportunity to write lyrics that reflected the reality of our lives."

Songs such as "Turn to Dust" introduced sarangi and other instrumentation atypical for the band. The lyrical content featured a darker and more introspective turn for the most part, with lighter fare restricted to the Prince-influenced "Slang".

Slang was the first Leppard album to fail to achieve platinum sales in the US.  Elsewhere, it performed better: it placed four singles on the UK charts, and went platinum in Canada. On the supporting tour the band performed for the first time in Southeast Asia, South Africa and South America. Only the album's title track has been played live after the Slang World Tour of 1996 to 1997 with it being performed regularly in the early 2000's and occasionally after, mostly recently during their Las Vegas residency of 2019.

A limited edition release included a six-track bonus disc, "Acoustic in Singapore", recorded live in October 1995.

Deluxe edition
On 22 November 2011, Collen revealed in an interview with the Birmingham Express And Star newspaper that the band plan to reissue Slang with extra tracks. He stated the band "...did have a lot of songs when we recorded, different versions, songs that never quite got finished." On 26 December 2011, Campbell gave an update on the reissue while speaking on his Facebook page in response to fan questions about Christmas songs. "We did once record a song called "Heavy Metal Christmas" during the Slang sessions - tongues very firmly in cheeks! It was actually a proper (and rather good!) song but was lacking lyrics - hence the goof-off title. It'll likely see the light of day when we re-release Slang soon. Some unheard stuff, too, as far as I know."

On 18 January 2012, Campbell mentioned on his Facebook that "Ownership of Slang masters (and all out-takes) revert to us later this year, so there's a good chance that we'll re-release with bonus material."

Elliott confirmed on his 25 August 2012 Planet Rock radio show that "...in a few months time we are re-releasing Slang as a double vinyl, a double CD with loads and loads of different mixes, bonus tracks and all sorts of stuff." This was followed by Elliott playing the band's 1999 Euphoria b-side 'Burnout' (first released on the "Goodbye" CD single) at the end of the show and revealing it had been recorded during the 1995/1996 Slang sessions. The singer described it as "...a little teaser", implying that the song may be included on the re-issue.

On 21 January 2014, it was announced on Def Leppard's Twitter page that Slang will be reissued on 11 February 2014. The album included 19 additional tracks, made up of various early versions of songs on the original, as well as previously unreleased material.

As of 2023, Slang remains the only album in Def Leppard's discography to not receive a re-release on vinyl outside of its inclusion in the "Volume 2" boxset in 2019, even after other albums from the 1990s such as Adrenalize, Retro Active and Euphoria were reissued in the preceding year.

Reception
Slang received mixed reviews. Stephen Thomas Erlewine of AllMusic rated the album three out of five, writing that the band's change in their approach with Slang was "apparent and welcome -- Def Leppard hasn't sounded so immediate since Pyromania." He further adds that the band "expand their musical vocabulary slightly, working elements of R&B and funk into the rhythms." Erlewine concludes that "Slang would have been even better if they had come up with a set of hooks that sounded as alive as their performance, but the album is a much-needed return to form for the group."

Conversely, Sputnik Music was more critical of the album, rating it two and a half out of five. They criticized Slang'''s seeming lack of direction and how "the veteran Sheffield outfit (alongside new co-producer Pete Woodroffe) decide to throw absolutely everything at the wall to see what sticks." They further added that "in progressing outside of their comfort zone, their limitations have become a little too apparent." Sputnik Music was, however, more positive towards "All I Want is Everything", "Work It Out", "Breath a Sigh" and "Deliver Me", deeming them to be "a solid and workmanlike mid-album quartet of tracks which make the album passable." They concluded that Slang "may be a passable release (if only just), but it leaves Def Leppard’s future very much up in the air."
 
"The whole thing is potty," David Quantick wrote in Q, "but in a supple and melodic way – even the ballads lack the usual Def Leppard sense of having been written for lead-lined hippos to sing. Slang is the sound of a band doing something fast and interesting, at the exact point in their lives when most bands are taking up golf and inhaling the contents of aquariums in country manors." Q'' later included the album among its 'best of 1996', describing it as "the work of a huge band, aware that the straight-ahead rock they once plied so enthusiastically is dead and who have embraced the new breed with élan."

Track listing

Personnel

Def Leppard
 Rick Allen – drums, percussion
 Vivian Campbell – electric & acoustic guitars, dulcimer, vocals
 Phil Collen – electric & acoustic guitars, mandolin, vocals
 Joe Elliott – lead vocals (additional guitar & bass on "Pearl of Euphoria")
 Rick Savage – bass, acoustic guitars, synth bass, vocals

Additional musicians
 Gloria Flores – Spanish voice on "Slang"
 Ram Narayan – intro sarangi sample on "Turn to Dust"
 Craig Pruess – string and percussion arranging and conducting on "Turn to Dust"
 Av Singh – dohl on "Turn to Dust"
 Shyam Vatish – outro sarangi sample on "Turn to Dust"
 Pete Woodroffe – piano on "Blood Runs Cold", keyboard strings on "Where Does Love Go When It Dies"
 Gavyn Wright – string leader on "Turn to Dust"

Production
 Pete Woodroffe – producer, engineer, mixing
 Def Leppard – producer
 Ger McDonnell – engineer, programming on "Truth?"
 Matt Pakucko – mixing assistant
 Bob Ludwig – mastering
 Brad Buxer, Bobby Brooks – programming on "Slang" and "Breathe a Sigh"
 Hugh Drumm – programming on "Truth?"
 Jeff Murray – art direction
 Jager di Paola – design
 Cynthia Levine, Jeff Rooney – photography

Charts

Certifications

References

Notes

External links
 Mercury Records: Def Leppard - Behind the Songs

Def Leppard albums
1996 albums
Mercury Records albums
Alternative rock albums by British artists
Grunge albums